John Michael Salisbury,  (born March 1942) is an English documentary filmmaker specialising in natural history programmes for television. In a career spanning four decades, he spent over 30 years working for the BBC Natural History Unit where he produced a string of award-winning series, many in collaboration with David Attenborough. He retired from the Unit in 2006 but continues to work as a freelance producer. In 2007, he was made an OBE in the New Year Honours List for his services to broadcasting.

Film & TV credits
 Natural World strand:
 Episode "Cork: Forest in a Bottle" (2008) - producer
 Episode "Transylvania, Living with Predators" (2001) - producer
 Episode "Wolves and Buffalo: An Ancient Alliance" (1997) - producer
 Episode "Snowdonia: Realm of the Ravens" (1994) - producer
 Series editor (1989-1993)
 Miniseries New Guinea: An Island Apart (1992) - executive producer
 Episode "Haida Gwaii: Islands of the People" (1990) - producer
 Miniseries Kingdom of the Ice Bear (1985) - writer & producer
 Episode "Through Animal Eyes" (1985) - writer & producer
 "Gorillas Revisited" (2006) - on-screen participant
 Life in the Undergrowth (2005) - series producer
 The Way We Went Wild (2004) - on-screen participant
 The Life of Mammals (2002) - series producer
 They Said It Couldn't Be Done (1999) - on-screen participant
 The Life of Birds (1998) - executive producer
 BBC Wildlife Specials strand:
 Episode "Wolf" (1997) - producer
 The Private Life of Plants (1995) - executive producer
 Lost Worlds, Vanished Lives (1989) - executive producer
 Wildlife on One strand:
 Episode "Unearthing the Mole" (1989) - producer
 Episode "Shipwreck" (1980) - producer
 The Discovery of Animal Behaviour (1982) - producer
 Animal Olympians (1980) - assistant producer
 Life on Earth (1979) - assistant producer
 Animal Magic (1975) - director
 The World About Us'' (1974) - assistant producer

See also
 Nature documentary
 BBC Natural History Unit
 NHU Filmography
 David Attenborough
 Green Screen film festival International Wildlife Filmfestival Eckernfoerde

References

External links
 
 Profile at WildFilmHistory
 Oral history at WildFilmHistory
 Filmography at the British Film Institute

1942 births
British television producers
Living people
Officers of the Order of the British Empire